Nektaria Karantzi (Greek: Νεκταρία Καραντζή; born 5 August 1982 in Greece) is a Byzantine and traditional singer from Greece.

Her voice has been identified mainly with the Byzantine sacred art and has been regarded as one of the most important voices in Byzantine Chant. She is the unique Greek performer of Byzantine music, with a discography in this music since she was fourteen, and with active work of chanting as a chorister in church since she was nine.  Her performances in concert halls in Greece and abroad are purely devoted to Byzantine Chant and she has been internationally acclaimed as the most ideal performer of Byzantine Melos (chanting) and of the Primeval Tradition.

Education

Legal studies 
Nektaria Karantzi studied law at the Aristotle University of Thessaloniki, and also obtained three postgraduates degree in criminal law, in criminology and in ecclesiastical Law from the University of Athens. She is currently a doctoral candidate in criminal law at the University of Athens. She is also a Doctor of Laws. She has worked as an editor at Law Publishers P. Sakoulas, at the magazine "Penal Law Chronicles", she was an associate of Department of Criminal Law of the Athens University and has associated with the Law Firms of the former President of the Piraeus Bar Association and the President of Lawyers Fund Mr.Vassilis Venetis and Mr. Platon Niadis.

Music 
Karantzi holds a diploma in Byzantine music from the Byzantine School of Music, and has been taught by notable tutors, including Dimitris Verykios. She was in training, as of 2003, in traditional singing by the renowned interpreter of traditional songs, Chronis Aidonidis. In addition, she has studied the piano and Western musical theory, and has also had voice training under the tutelage of Thanos Petrakis and Dina Goudioti.

Musical career 
Nektaria Karantzi teaches Byzantine music at the "Central Conservatoire" of Athens. She has also begun collaborating with Chronis Aidonidis in concerts and recordings.

She has participated in a series of five tapes/CDs which include the chanting of Byzantine hymns, from the age of fourteen already accompanying the blessed Elder Porphyrios. She also collaborated with Chronis Aidonidis in the recording of two albums: When Paths Meet (a double CD) and He Was Grieved.

In her first recordings of chanting, Karantzi accompanied a contemporary saint, Saint Porphyrios the Kapsokalyvite and with his encouragement she started her studies in Byzantine Music at a very early age. She completed her studies in Byzantine Music, received a Degree and a Diploma from the Byzantine Music School of the Holy Metropolis of Piraeus, taught by notable tutors including Dimitris Verykios. Nektaria Karantzi is also well known in Greek stage music through her apprenticeship and lengthy collaboration with the greatest teacher of the Greek Traditional Music Chronis Aidonides. Another important aspect of her career was her collaboration with the acclaimed pianist, composer and conductor Vassilis Tsabropoulos, in an artistic combination inspired by Byzantine hymns, joining West and East.

Live performances 
She gave her first performance at the Athens Concert Hall on 25 May 2004, in a concert showcasing Chronis Aidonidis career. Since then, she has participated in many other concerts and events.

In 2005, she participated with Chronis Aidonidis and Dimitris Verykios in the Easter television show titled He was grieved on the Hellenic TV channel in which she sang Byzantine hymns for the Holy Week. In 2006, she participated in the sixth Festival of Sacred Music in Patmos.

Other key moments in her career were the invitations from the Franz Liszt Academy of Music in Hungary and the Sorbonne University in France where she gave a Master Class about Byzantine Music. Nektaria has presented many concerts of Byzantine and Traditional Folk Music in Greece and abroad (in France, Hungary, Serbia, Turkey, North Macedonia, Bulgaria, Estonia, Switzerland, Letonia, Luxembourg, Spain, Italy) while she has collaborated with the greatest traditional singer of Hungary and UNESCO artist for Peace Marta Sebestyen and the distinguished choir the St. Ephraim male Choir.

Discography 
Discography

With Saint Porphyrios of Kafsokalyvia

1. Elder Porphyrios & Nektaria Karantzi: "Jesus Glikitate" (ed. "The transfiguration of the Savior", 1993)
2. Elder Porphyrios & Nektaria Karantzi: "Hymnissomen pantes theoprepos" (ed. "The transfiguration of the Savior", 1996)
3. Elder Porphyrios & Nektaria Karantzi: "Evlogitos o Theos" (ed. "The transfiguration of the Savior", 1998)
4. Elder Porphyrios & Nektaria Karantzi: "Prokatharomen eaftous" (ed. "The transfiguration of the Savior", 2001)

With Chronis Aidonidis

1. Chronis Aidonidis & Nektaria Karantzi: "Otan i dromi synantiountai" (ed. Melodiko Karavi, 2004)
2. Chronis Aidonidis & Nektaria Karantzi: "Epikranthi" (ed. Apostolic Diakonia of Church of Greece, 2006)
3. Chronis Aidonidis & Nektaria Karantzi: "Afraston Thavma" (ed. Legend/Lyra, 2009)

With Vassilis Tsabropoulos

1. Vassilis Tsabropoulos & Nektaria Karantzi: "Eleison" (ed. MSO, 2016)

Personal:

1. Nektaria Karantzi: "Hymns and Lamentations of Holly Week" (Limited Edition – 2011)
2. Nektaria Karantzi: "Hymns and Song for the Mother of God" (Limited Edition 2012)
3. Nektaria Karantzi: "Christmas Hymns and Carols" (Limited Edition 2012)
4. Nektaria Karantzi: "Anastasis" (Limited Editions – 2013)
5. Nektaria Karantzi: "Hymns and Songs to the Mother of God" (ed. Radio Station of the Greek Orthodox Church- 2014)

Selected Participations:

1. "The ring of Emperor", Grigoriadou Soureli's book & CD/Music: George Voukanos (ed. Apostolic Diakonia of Church of Greece, 2006)
2. "1936–2006 Apostoliki Diakonia", a cd Tribut to 70 years of Apostolic Diakonia of Church of Greece ( Limited Edition 2006)
3. "Estoudiantina – Na ta poume" (limited edition. 2009)
4. "Chronis Aidonidis, the master of Tradition" (limited edition, 2009)
5."Kalossorissate" live concert at the Athens Concert Hall (2009)
6. "Ionias Egkomion", live concert at the Athens Concert Hall (2010)

Honours 
Nektaria Karantzi is the Founder and the Honorary President of the Panhellenic Association of Women in Byzantine ecclesiastical Music while she has been honored for her contribution to Byzantine Music by the Byzantine Chanters [Ieropsaltes] through the Hellenic Musicological Society – Institute for Byzantine and Greek Traditional Music Studies and the music magazine "To Psaltiri". She is also the artistic director of the Traditional Music School "Chronis Aidonides" and she is Legal Advisor and Public Relations and Press Manager of the Metropolitan Symphony Orchestra of Athens.

Other activities 
She is part of the development group of an internet musical community in Greece, www.musicheaven.gr and is a producer at a Greek radio station.

References

External links 
 
 Official Facebook fanpage
 Tribute to Nektaria Karantzi, from ieropsaltis.com

1978 births
Living people
National and Kapodistrian University of Athens alumni
21st-century Greek women singers
Traditional musicians
Byzantine singers
Greek laïko singers
Performers of Byzantine music
People from Laconia